Héctor Martínez Colón is a Puerto Rican politician. He served as member of the Senate of Puerto Rico for the District of Ponce from 1969 to 1973. Martínez also served as part of the Puerto Rico House of Representatives.

Background 

Martínez is married to Persi Maldonado. They have five children together. The youngest, Héctor Martínez Maldonado, served as senator also, from 2005 to 2011 when he was convicted for several charges of corruption.

References

New Progressive Party (Puerto Rico) politicians
Members of the Senate of Puerto Rico
Year of birth missing (living people)
Living people
Place of birth missing (living people)